Numerous different surgical suture materials exist. The following table compares some of the most common adsorbable sutures.

References 

3.Types of sutures and suture materials
Surgical suture material